Danielis is a surname.  Notable people with the surname include:

 Daniel Danielis (1635–1696), Belgian composer
 Servius Danielis or Maurus Servius Honoratus, fourth-century Italian grammarian